Twenty Hours is a 1965 Hungarian drama film directed by Zoltán Fábri. The film was selected as the Hungarian entry for the Best Foreign Language Film at the 38th Academy Awards, but was not accepted as a nominee. The film shared the Grand Prix with War and Peace and won the Prix FIPRESCI at the 4th Moscow International Film Festival.

Cast 

 Antal Páger as Chairman Jóska
 János Görbe as Anti Balogh
 Emil Keres as the reporter
 Ádám Szirtes as Béni Kocsis
 László György as Sándor Varga
 József Bihari as András Cuha
 Lajos Őze as Kiskovács
 János Makláry (credited as János Maklári) as György Vencel
 Károly Kovács as the count
 Gyula Bodrogi as the doctor
 Ági Mészáros as Terus
 Tibor Molnár as Máthé

See also
 List of submissions to the 38th Academy Awards for Best Foreign Language Film
 List of Hungarian submissions for the Academy Award for Best Foreign Language Film

References

External links
 

1965 films
1960s Hungarian-language films
1965 drama films
Hungarian black-and-white films
Films directed by Zoltán Fábri
Hungarian drama films